Soul's Core is the fourth studio album by American rock singer-songwriter Shawn Mullins, spawning the hit "Lullaby" (#1 on Adult Top 40, #9 on Modern Rock), as well as "Shimmer" (#27 on Adult Top 40). It was first released on July 7, 1998.

Track listing 
All songs written by Shawn Mullins, except where noted

Personnel 
 Brandon Bush – clavichord, drum loops, organ, piano, Wurlitzer
 Chad Franscoviak – handclapping, background vocals
 Rob Gal – drum loops, electric guitar
 David LaBruyere – bass guitar
 Kevin Leahy – drums
 Don McCollister – bass guitar
 Travis McNabb – drums
 Glenn Matullo – handclapping, background vocals
 Shawn Mullins – acoustic guitar, electric guitar, percussion, piano, tambourine, lead vocals, background vocals
 Myshkin – mandolin, background vocals
 David Patterson – electric guitar, synthesizer strings
 Mike West – banjo, banjolin, electric guitar, keyboards
 Shelley Yankus – background vocals

Charts

Certifications

References 

1998 albums
Shawn Mullins albums
Columbia Records albums
Albums produced by Peter Collins (record producer)